Karlsbakk is a surname. Notable people with the surname include:

 Daniel Karlsbakk (born 2003), Norwegian footballer
 Eivind Karlsbakk (born 1975), Norwegian footballer
 Markus Karlsbakk (born 2000), Norwegian footballer

Norwegian-language surnames